Events during the year 1947 in Northern Ireland.

Incumbents
 Governor - 	Earl Granville 
 Prime Minister - Basil Brooke

Events
22 April – British Royal Navy aircraft carrier  (laid down 1944) is launched at the Harland and Wolff shipyard in Belfast.
11 August – The Enterprise express train service commences from Belfast to Dublin.
The "bad winter" seen snow reach heights of 30 feet, lasting until May-June from the winter period.

Arts and literature

Sport

Football
Irish League
Winners: Belfast Celtic

Irish Cup
Winners: Belfast Celtic 1 – 0 Glentoran

GAA
 Cavan defeat Antrim 3-04 to 1–06 to win the Ulster Senior Football Championship.
 Cavan subsequently defeat Kerry 2–11 to 2–07 in New York City to win the All-Ireland Senior Football Championship.

Golf
Fred Daly wins The Open Championship at the Royal Liverpool Golf Club, Hoylake.
Fred Daly plays in the Ryder Cup.

Swimming
27–28 July – English endurance swimmer Tom Blower becomes the first person to swim the North Channel, from Donaghadee in County Down to Portpatrick in Scotland.

Births
23 February – Ken Goodall, international rugby player (died 2006).
5 March – Clodagh Rodgers, singer.
24 March – John Dallat, Social Democratic and Labour Party politician.
17 April – Linda Martin, singer.
23 April – Bernadette Devlin McAliskey, Member of UK Parliament.
8 May – Dr John Reid, 13th Secretary of State for Northern Ireland and Home Secretary.
18 May – Eileen Pollock, actress.
19 May – Paul Brady, singer-songwriter.
12 August – Seamus Close, former Alliance Party MLA.
3 September – Eric Bell, guitarist.
26 October – Sir Reg Empey, leader of the Ulster Unionist Party, member of the Northern Ireland Assembly.
5 December – Seán Quinn, businessman.

Full date unknown
Paul Haller, Soto Zen Buddhist teacher and Abbot of the San Francisco Zen Center.
Joe McCann, Official Irish Republican Army volunteer killed by British soldiers (died 1972).
Eugene McMenamin, SDLP MLA
Frank Ormsby, poet
Eric Wrixon, musician

Deaths
2 January – Tom Ross, cricketer (born 1872)
4 January – Forrest Reid, novelist and literary critic (born 1875)
25 April – Richard Rowley, poet and writer (born 1877).

See also
1947 in Scotland
1947 in Wales

References